Al-Lawatia (sing. Lawati) is a tribe primarily based in the province of Muscat, Oman.

Lawatis are a prominent tribe. Many Lawati families of successful merchants of the past are now involved in large multi-faceted corporations participating in the development of the region.

Origins
The Lawatia (or Lawatiyya) community in Muttrah in Muscat are of Ismaili origins. Lawatis are traders and merchants by profession, Lawatis travelled the world for trade and ultimately settled in some of the countries to oversee their businesses. They converted to Twelver Shia Islam in the 19th century from Ismaili Shia Islam.

Demographics and role in the Persian Gulf
The majority of Lawatis reside in Muscat, the capital of Oman, but some live on the coast of Al-Batina. Some Lawati families reside elsewhere in the Persian Gulf region such as the United Arab Emirates, Qatar, Bahrain and Kuwait.

Traditionally, Al-Lawatia have been known as prominent merchants on the coasts of Muttrah which lies 2 kilometers west of Muscat. They have worked in the incense, jewelry and clothes business as well as in general trade. The community occupies a gated quarter of Muttrah known as Sur al-Lawatia. The quarter still boasts attractive houses with a unique Islamic architectural view and a large mosque known as Al-Rasul Al-Aadam Mosque or The Greatest Prophets Mosque in reference to Muhammad. The Sur has seen a major exodus in recent decades as Lawatis have moved to more modern neighborhoods as a result of increasing development, the availability of facilities and growing wealth and business of the community. Another great historic monument built by the tribe is Al-Zahra Mosque in the UAE, which was built nearly 300 years ago 

There are estimated to be eighty thousand Lawatiyya dispersed over the gulf. In the predominantly Ibadhi Sunni arena of Oman, they make up the majority of the local Shia population. It is believed the Lawatis traveled to Oman many years ago from ancient Hyderabad, appearing in Oman as early as the 1600s

Through the 1700s and later, Lawatiyya quickly developed an impressive trade industry in the local Matrah port, selling everything from incense to jewelry. They even began to occupy their own quarter of the harbor called Sur al-Lawatiyya (sur meaning enclosure), which was constructed into beautiful aqua tiled town houses that have been preserved to this day. Many wealthy Lawati families have moved out to suburban areas, but the mosque in Matrah remains the principle Shia mosque for Oman. In the past, religious leaders of the mosque have been recruited from Iran, Iraq, and Bahrain.

History and notable families

The first historical mention of the Lawatis is said to have been by the Omani historian Ibn Ruzayq, who said that notables of the community greeted the first ruler of the currently ruling Al Said dynasty on his arrival to Muscat in the 1740.

At least one Lawati family can be documented through British records as existing in Oman since the 1700s, those were the first group came to serve the British crown

Perhaps one of the most notable political families from the Al-Lawati tribe is Al-Abdulateef family, with names such as Al Hajj Baqer Abdulateef Fadel and Ali Abdulateef Fadel spearheading the tribe into prominence in the early 20th century. Al Hajj Baqer, one of the pioneer merchants in Muttrah and well-respected public figure, lead the tribe as the Lawati sheikh, he enjoyed a strong relationship with the ruling Al Said house particularly Sultan Said bin Taimur. It is widely known that he privately aided the Omani government's efforts in expelling the Saudi contingents from Al Buraimi in 1952.

It is notable that the first woman ambassador from Oman was Khadijah bint Hassan al-Lawati, a Lawati woman appointed to the Netherlands in 1999.
 
Some notable names in the family: Hussain Jawad ( Board of directors Towell ), Hussain Salman Al Lawati,(Founder and Was Vice Chairman and Managing Director. Since Inception).  Maqbool Hamid (Chairman OHI Petroleum & Energy Services LLC ), Maqbool Salman (Chairman Salman Corporation), Maqbool bin Ali Sultan (H.E. Maqbool Ali Sultan is the former Minister of Commerce and Industry of the Sultanate of Oman, a position he held for 20 years.),Hussain sajwani,(Hussain Sajwani, is an Emirati billionaire businessman, and the founder and chairman of the property development company, DAMAC Properties, and his private investment company, DICO group.) Fouad sajwani,(H.E. Dr. Fuad Al Sajwani served as Minister of Agriculture and Fisheries from 2011 until April 2019.) Ali Mohammed Jumma,(Ali Mohammed Juma is the Co-Founder and Chief Executive of Vision Investments Services, one of the leading investment advisory and asset management companies in the Sultanate of Oman.) Ali Malleulah Al Habeeb Al Lawati,( Ali Malallah Al Lawati is Chairman of Al Habib Co LLC. He is also Chairman and Founder of Sports 4 All LLC. Ownership Updates.) Huda Al Lawati.(Huda Al Lawati’s career has spanned 16 years in strategy, investment and portfolio management across emerging market private equity and corporates.) Mustafa Abdulredha Sultan (Founder of Mustafa Sultan Enterprises) .
 
The Al-Muscati surname of some families in Kuwait and Bahrain suggests that they were Muscati immigrants, and are believed to be of Lawati origin. Some Al-Muscati families live in Oman today. They are Lawatis who obtained their surname during the period when they immigrated and lived in Kuwait, before they went back to Oman in the late seventies.
Today there are many families and clans within the Lawati tribe including Al-Abdulateef, Al-Nadwani, Al-Saleh, Al-Khabouri, Al-Wardy, Al-Kokar, Dara, Al-Habib and Al-Najwani in Oman. In the U.A.E Al-Lawati families include: Al-Sajwani, Al-Issa, Al-Shalwani, Al-Yousef, Jafar Ali, Al-Aboodi, AL-Kashwani, Al-Buqellah, Al-Fiqerani and Fadhlani. Today there are between 5,000 and 10,000 Lawatis living in Oman.

Religion
Verbal history indicates that at one point they were Muslim Shia in various branches. They now follow the Twelver Shia Islam. Consequently, the new adopted doctrine of Twelver/Jaafari grew within the Lawati tribe and the different branches were not accepted. Hence, some retracted while others detached from the community. However, most present-day Lawatis are known to be Twelver Shia Muslims. And with the process of mingling with the other groups, few Lawatis brought up through mixed marriages either following mixed Shia/Sunni or Shia/Ibadhi traditions. However, Laurence Louër, in his book Transnational Shia Politics: Religious and Political Networks in the Gulf, mentions a different theory of the religious origins of Al-Lawati. According to this theory, the Lawatis were Ismailis who migrated to Oman from Sindh in the 19th century, before converting to Twelver Shi'ism following a dispute with the leadership of the community.

Language

The native mother language of Al-Lawaties  is Lawati language which is called in their own tongue as (Khojki). This idiom is genetically and morphologically related to the Sindhi language; a branch of the Indo-European tree. As it also shares common similarities with other spoken languages of the other ethnic groups in Oman e.g. Jadgali , Maimani and Al Saigh. Elderlies were fluent in both the written and the spoken Khojki.

Arabic as a first language of Oman and all Arabia, is also held tightly by Al-Lawaties in parallel with their mother tongue language Khojki.  However, the trend now within this community is to abandon their own native language and more people of the young generation are found not to know how to write nor speak it, most Lawatis today are not as fluent in Kojki as their ancestors as they consider Arabic their mothertongue with Kojki and English relegated to secondary languages.

Sur Al Lawatia

Sur Al Lawatiya, located at the heart of one of Oman’s major tourist hubs, is instantly recognisable by its palatial mansions and gate. For decades, this scenic quarter was closed to all but members and guests of the tribe who lived there, though the reasons for this seclusion were never made official. Today it is no longer officially closed off to visitors, but the isolated walled district continues to fascinate travellers looking to gain a glimpse into the lives of its residents.

A historically secluded town
Muscat’s neighbouring city Muttrah was once the heart of Oman’s trading empire, with a harbour buzzing full of ships bringing cargo from Basra, Persia, India, East Africa and beyond. Fortunes were made by the merchants of this coastal area, and chief among Muttrah’s most skilled traders were the Lawatiya. For centuries they lived in a walled quarter, Sur Al Lawatiya, which is adjacent to the souk. The Sur, as it is known, gained a reputation over the years as Oman’s ‘forbidden city’ because only members of the Lawati tribe were allowed to enter.

While its palatial homes and arabesque designs showcased the prosperity of Oman’s wealthiest merchants, the permanent closure of the Sur’s two wooden gates made it a separate world from the clamour of the souk adjacent to it. No one knows why the walled quarter was closed for so long. Some researchers suggest that, being a small Shiite community, the Lawatis preferred to seclude themselves, like their coreligionists in Najaf and Karbala. Others offer a far more practical reason: that it was to allow their women to move in their neighbourhood unveiled.

Very little concrete information is known about its origins, but experts have developed fascinating hypotheses around Sur Al Lawatiya’s origins. Some believe the walled quarter was originally the site of a Portuguese garrison, built at a time when their colonial empire included parts of Oman.

According to The Architecture of Oman by Salma Damluji, ‘The Portuguese are thought to have originally founded the settlement, since a Portuguese garrison is recorded there in the 17th century. It is possible that after the Portuguese were expelled the area was given over by the Sultan to the Hyderabadi community (known as Lawatiya or Luwatiya).’

Is Sur Al Lawatiya still forbidden today?
The seclusion and relative isolation of the Sur has spurred the imaginations of many travellers. Today its gates might be open, but strangers are still not welcome by residents – a sign at the gates even forbids ‘foreigners’. Why this is remains unknown, just like the origins of the walled quarter.

While researchers continue to piece together the puzzle of Sur Al Lawatiya, travellers will no doubt remain fascinated by the potential secrets lurking behind its walls. Anyone visiting Muttrah’s popular harbour and bustling souk should take the time to glance at the magnificent homes of the Sur and let their minds wander to the men and women who built them – if they manage to make it in.

References

Social groups of Oman
Sindhi tribes
Ethnic groups in Oman